The 2022 Hamburg Sea Devils season is the second season of the Hamburg Sea Devils team in the European League of Football.

Preseason
On November 24, 2021, the Hamburg Sea Devils began to announce their first player signings, beginning with their running back Glen Toonga. The head coach and offensive coordinator Andreas Nommensen stated in December 2021 that he won't return for the 2022 season due to personal reasons. On February 3, 2022, Charles "Yogi" Jones was officially announced as the new head coach for the season.

Regular season

Standings

Schedule

Source: europeanleague.football

Roster

Transactions
From Barcelona Dragons: Jéan Constant (December 6, 2021)

From Leipzig Kings: Shalom Baafi (February 21, 2022)

Staff

Notes

References 

Hamburg Sea Devils (ELF) seasons
Hamburg Sea Devils
Hamburg Sea Devils